Lac-Fouillac is a former unorganized territory in the Abitibi-Témiscamingue region of Quebec, Canada, now part the Municipality of Rivière-Héva in the La Vallée-de-l'Or Regional County Municipality.

In July 2007, the residents of Lac-Fouillac overwhelmingly rejected the amalgamation of their territory with the City of Malartic. 96% of voters voted against annexation in a referendum. But two years later on August 29, 2009, Lac-Fouillac, together with the western portion of the Unorganized Territory of Lac-Granet, was merged into the Municipality of Rivière-Héva.

Demographics
Population:
 Population in 2006: 91
 Population in 2001: 77
 Population in 1996: 174
 Population in 1991: 168

References

Former unorganized territories in Quebec
Populated places disestablished in 2009